Brett Blair Raguse (born 24 March 1960) is a former Australian politician. He was a member of the House of Representatives from 2007 to 2010, representing the Division of Forde for the Australian Labor Party (ALP).

Early life
Raguse was born in Brisbane, Queensland. His unwed 17-year-old mother Denise gave him up for adoption at birth. Prior to entering politics he worked as a compositor, schoolteacher and director of a TAFE college.

Politics
Raguse gained Labor pre-selection to contest the normally safe Liberal seat of Forde at the 2007 federal election. A position previously held by retiring Liberal Kay Elson. He won an unexpected 14% swing on election day, easily defeating new Liberal candidate Wendy Creighton in what was generally viewed as one of the main upset results of the election.  He lost his seat in the 2010 federal election to the LNP candidate Bert van Manen.

In March 2015, Raguse confirmed he would be a candidate for mayor of Logan City in the Queensland local government elections set for 19 March 2016.

References

Australian Labor Party members of the Parliament of Australia
1960 births
Living people
Members of the Australian House of Representatives for Forde
Members of the Australian House of Representatives
21st-century Australian politicians
Griffith University alumni
Australian adoptees
20th-century Australian people